Ultimate Software was an American multinational technology company that developed and sold UltiPro, a cloud-based human capital management (HCM) software system for businesses. Headquartered in Weston, Florida, the company was founded in 1990 by Scott Scherr, and released its first version of software in 1993. As of the fourth quarter in 2017, Ultimate Software reported total revenues of over $940.7 million. As of 2017, the company employs more than 5,000 people and services 4,100 customers in 160 countries. Ultimate has offices around the USA, Canada, UK, and Singapore. On February 4, 2019, Hellman & Friedman Capital Partners announced it would purchase Ultimate Software Group for $11 billion; the purchase closed on May 3, 2019.

On 18 February 2020, Ultimate Software announced that Fortune and Great Place to Work ranked the company #2 on the 100 Best Companies to Work For list for 2020. This marks the company's highest-ever ranking on the nationwide list and its fourth consecutive year in the top 10, with the company having ranked in the top 25 of the list since 2012.

In February 2020, Ultimate Software announced its plan to merge with Kronos Incorporated to form a new cloud computing venture specializing in human resource software. The merger was officially completed on April 1, 2020. The new company, which is called Ultimate Kronos Group, is headed by Kronos CEO Aron Ain.

History 
Ultimate Software was founded in 1990 by Scott Scherr. In 1993, the tech company released UltiPro HRMS/ payroll sold as on-premises software servicing core HR and payroll. The company went public (NASDAQ: ULTI) in June 1998.

In 2002, UltiPro was reintroduced as a cloud-based Software-as-a-Service (SaaS) to provide a unified management tool for human resources.  This model has allowed the company to hold more than 33 million client records in the cloud and service more than 3,400 customers, according to Career Builder. The company announced they were expanding outside of the United States and opened an office in London, England. Later that year, Ultimate announced additional expansions into Singapore.

Products and services 
The company's UltiPro is a cloud-based platform that delivers human capital management to organizations across all industries. UltiPro provides one system of record for HR, payroll, and talent management. According to TrustRadius, UltiPro now includes time and attendance, employee onboarding, performance management, compensation management, succession management, recruiting, and other features like predictive analytics. UltiPro is sold via a SaaS model, with a per-employee-per-month subscription.

Partnering Research 
According to the Center for Generational Kinetics, the center partnered with the company in 2014 to conduct research on multiple generations in the workforce. The research looked at work expectations across different generations, with a focus on millennials.

The study explored how millennials differ from prior generations in the way they feel about applying for a job, interviewing, receiving feedback, and leaving a job.

In 2016, the Center for Generational Kinetics continued their partnership to examine the drivers and motivators behind the people in our workforce. The study focused on how organizations can understand and improve the employee experience.

References

External links 
 Ultimate Software

Software companies based in Florida
Companies based in Broward County, Florida
Software companies established in 1990
American companies established in 1990
1990 establishments in Florida
1998 initial public offerings
Companies formerly listed on the Nasdaq
Cloud computing providers
Human resource management software
Weston, Florida
2019 mergers and acquisitions
2020 mergers and acquisitions
Private equity portfolio companies
Defunct software companies of the United States